Physaraceae is a family of slime molds in the order Physarales.

Genera
The following genera are members of Physaraceae:

Badhamia
Craterium
Fuligo
Kelleromyxa
Leocarpus
Physarella
Physarina
Physarum

The genus Willkommlangea may also belong in this family.

References

 
Amoebozoa families